KADR (since 1989 Studio Filmowe Kadr) is a major Polish film production and distribution company, founded in 1955 and still producing films as of 2016. Between its founding and 2003, KADR released 150 films in total, including many classics of Polish cinema.

History

"Arguably the most important Polish film studio," Kadr was founded on May 1, 1955, by filmmaker Jerzy Kawalerowicz, and its initial output is closely associated with him. Along with Krzysztof Teodor Toeplitz and Tadeusz Konwicki, Kawalerowicz was a primary influence on the development of the Polish Film School in the 1950s. With a few exceptions, its landmark films were produced at Kadr.

The organization began as one of a few "film units" (zespoły filmowe) set up as state enterprises, and with close connections to the establishment National Film School in Łódź. By 1968 Kadr was a major studio, producing perhaps four titles annually, including the big-budget three-year period production of Pharaoh, nominated for an Academy Award for Best Foreign Language Film in 1967.

The studio was closed in the political turmoil of March 1968, and re-established three years later on January 1, 1972.  Kawalerowicz continued as artistic director from the founding until his death in 2007.

Films
Following is a partial list of films released by Kadr:

 Pokolenie (A Generation), directed by Andrzej Wajda, 1955
 Cień (Shadow), directed by Kawalerowicz, 1956
 Człowiek na torze (Man on the Tracks), directed by Andrzej Munk, 1956
 Kanał (Canal), directed by Andrzej Wajda, 1956
 Deszczowy lipiec (Rainy July), directed by Leonard Buczkowski, 1958
 Eroica, directed by Munk, 1958
 Krzyż walecznych (Cross of Valor), directed by Kazimierz Kutz, 1958
 Ostatni dzień lata (The Last Day of Summer), directed by Tadeusz Konwicki, 1958
 Popiół i diament (Ashes and Diamonds), directed by Wajda, 1958
 Lotna, directed by Wajda, 1959
 Orzeł (The Eagle), directed by Buczkowski, 1959
 Pociąg (Night Train), directed by Kawalerowicz, 1959 
 Nikt nie woła, directed by Kutz, 1960 
 Do widzenia, do jutra... (Goodbye Until Morning), directed by Janusz Morgenstern, 1960
 Niewinni czarodzieje (Innocent Sorcerers), directed by Wajda, 1960
 Czas przeszly (Time Past), directed by Buczkowski, 1961
 Matka Joanna od Aniołów (Mother Joan of the Angels), directed by Kawalerowicz, 1961
 Samson, directed by Wajda, 1961
 Zaduszki (All Souls' Day), directed by Konwicki, 1962
 Faraon (Pharaoh), directed by Kawalerowicz, 1965
 Salto, directed by Konwicki, 1965
 Marysia i Napoleon (Mary and Napoleon), directed by Buczkowski, 1966
 Gniazdo (The Cradle), directed by Jan Rybkowski, 1974
 Noce i dnie (Nights and Days), directed by Jerzy Antczak, 1975 (nominated for Academy Award for Best Foreign Language Film)
 Śmierć prezydenta (Death of a President), directed by Kawalerowicz, 1977
 Vabank, directed by Juliusz Machulski, 1981
 Seksmisja (Sexmission), directed by Malchulski, 1983
 Kingsajz, directed by Malchulski, 1987
 Quo Vadis, directed by Kawalerowicz, 2001
 Rewers (Reverse), directed by Borys Lankosz, 2009
 Sala Samobójców (Suicide Room), directed by Jan Komasa, 2011
''Piłsudski, directed by  Michał Rosa, 2019

References

External links
 Classic Polish Films on YouTube

Organizations established in 1955
1955 establishments in Poland
Film distributors of Poland
Film production companies of Poland